The Tata Steel Chess India Chess Tournament is a chess tournament held in Kolkata, India. It is held in the Rapid and Blitz formats. The venue for the event is National Library of India, Kolkata.

Winners

2018 
Tata Steel Chess India 2018 was the inaugural event of the Tata Steel Chess India. Hikaru Nakamura won the rapid section of the tournament, while former World Champion Viswanathan Anand won the blitz section by winning the blitz playoffs against Nakamura after they finished joint first in the blitz double round robin.
{| class="wikitable" style="text-align: center;"
|+Tata Steel Chess India Rapid, 9–11 November 2018, Kolkata, India
! !! Player !! Rating !! 1 !! 2 !! 3 !! 4 !! 5 !! 6 !! 7 !! 8 !! 9 !! 10 !! Total !! TB !! SB 
|-
|-style="background:#ccffcc;"
| 1 || align=left| || 2844 || ||  ||  ||  || 1 ||  ||  ||  || 1 || 1 || 6 || || 
|-
| 2 || align="left" | || 2743 ||  ||  || 1 ||  || 1 || 0 ||  || 1 ||  ||  || 5 || 1 ||
|-
| 3 || align="left" | || 2802 ||  || 0 ||  || 1 ||  ||  ||  ||  || 1 || 1 || 5 || 0 ||
|-
| 4 || align="left" | || 2808 ||  ||  || 0 ||  ||  ||  ||  || 1 || 1 ||  || 5 || || 20.75
|-
| 5 || align="left" | || 2794 || 0 || 0 ||  ||  ||  || 1 ||  || 1 ||  || 1 || 5 || || 19.75
|-
| 6 || align="left" | || 2792 ||  || 1 ||  ||  || 0 ||  ||  || 0 ||  || 1 || 4 || || 
|-
| 7 || align="left" | || 2737 ||  ||  ||  ||  ||  ||  ||  ||  ||  || 0 || 4 || || 19.25
|-
| 8 || align="left" | || 2660 ||  || 0 ||  || 0 || 0 || 1 ||  ||  ||  || 1 || 4 ||  || 16.25
|-
| 9 || align="left" | || 2612 || 0 ||  || 0 || 0 ||  ||  ||  ||  ||  ||  || 3 || || 
|-
| 10 || align="left" | || 2608 || 0 ||  || 0 ||  || 0 || 0 || 1 || 0 ||  ||  || 2 || || 
|}

{| class="wikitable" style="text-align: center;"
|+Tata Steel Chess India Blitz, 13–14 November 2018, Kolkata, India
! !! Player !! Rating !! 1 !! 2 !! 3 !! 4 !! 5 !! 6 !! 7 !! 8 !! 9 !! 10 !! Total !! TB !! SB 
|-
|-style="background:#ccffcc;"
| 1 || align=left| || 2786 || ||  || 0 || 1 || 1 || 1 || 11 || 0 || 11 || 11 || 12 || || 
|-
| 2 || align="left" | || 2893 ||  ||  ||  || 1 || 11 || 10 || 1 || 1 || 11 ||  || 12 || ||
|-
| 3 || align="left" | || 2854 || 1 ||  ||  ||  || 1 || 01 || 1 || 1 ||  || 11 || 12 || ||
|-
| 4 || align="left" | || 2771 || 0 || 0 ||  ||  || 11 || 10 ||  || 1 || 10 || 1 || 10 || || 
|-
| 5 || align="left" | || 2808 || 0 || 00 || 0 || 00 ||  ||  || 11 ||  || 01 || 11 || 8 || 3 || 
|-
| 6 || align="left" | || 2706 || 0 || 01 || 10 || 01 ||  ||  || 0 || 0 || 10 || 1 || 8 || 1.5 || 70.75
|-
| 7 || align="left" | || 2727 || 00 || 0 || 0 ||  || 00 || 1 ||  || 1 || 1 || 1 || 8 || 1.5 || 62.75
|-
| 8 || align="left" | || 2836 || 1 || 0 || 0 || 0 ||  || 1 || 0 ||  || 0 || 01 || 7 ||  || 
|-
| 9 || align="left" | || 2547 || 00 || 00 ||  || 01 || 10 || 01 || 0 || 1 ||  || 00 || 6 || || 
|-
| 10 || align="left" | || 2366 || 00 ||  || 00 || 0 || 00 || 0 || 0 || 10 || 11 ||  || 5 || || 
|}

2019 
The 2019 edition of Tata Steel India Rapid and Blitz was conducted as a part of the Grand Chess Tour 2019. The winner of the tournament was decided by the combination of rapid and blitz scores of the players with 2/1/0 points system for a win/draw/loss in rapid and 1/½/0 points system for a win/draw/loss in blitz. 
World Champion Magnus Carlsen won the overall event through a dominant performance in the rapid portion of the tournament and finishing joint first with Hikaru Nakamura in the blitz portion of the tournament.

{| class="wikitable" style="text-align: center;"
|+Tata Steel Chess India Rapid, 22–26 November 2019, Kolkata, India
! !! Player !! 1 !! 2 !! 3 !! 4 !! 5 !! 6 !! 7 !! 8 !! 9 !! 10 !! Total 
|-
|-style="background:#ccffcc;"
| 1 || align=left| || || 2   || 1   || 2   || 2 0 0 || 2 1  || 2 1 1 || 1 1 1 || 1 1  || 2 1 1 ||27
|-
| 2 || align="left" | || 0   ||  || 2   || 2   || 1   || 1  1 || 1   || 2 1 1 || 1  1 || 1 1 1 || 23
|-
| 3-4 || align="left" | || 1   || 0   ||  || 1 1  || 2   || 1   || 0 0 0 || 1  1 || 2   || 1  1 || 18
|-
| 3-4 || align="left" ||| 0   || 0   || 1 0  ||  || 1   || 2 0  || 2  1 || 1   || 1  1 || 1 1  || 18
|-
| 5 || align="left" ||| 0 1 1 || 1   || 0   || 1   ||  || 2  1 || 1   || 1 1 0 || 1 0  || 1 0 1 || 18
|-
| 6 || align="left" ||| 0 0  || 1  0 || 1   || 0 1  || 0  0 ||  || 2 1 1 || 0 0 1 || 2 1  || 1 1  || 17
|-
| 7 || align="left" | || 0 0 0 || 1   || 2 1 1 || 0  0 || 1   || 0 0 0 ||  || 1  1 || 1  0 || 2 1  || 16
|-
| 8-9 || align="left" ||| 1 0 0 || 0 0 0 || 1  0 || 1   || 1 0 1 || 2 1 0 || 1  0 ||  || 1   || 0 1  || 14
|-
| 8-9 || align="left" ||| 1 0  || 1  0 || 0   || 1  0 || 1 1  || 0 0  || 1  1 || 1   ||  || 0  1 || 14
|-
| 10 || align="left" | || 0 0 0 || 1 0 0 || 1  0 || 1 0  || 1 1 0 || 1 0  || 0 0  || 2 0  || 2  0 ||  || 13 
|}

2021  
{| class="wikitable" style="text-align: center;"
|+Tata Steel Chess India Rapid, 17–19 November 2021, Kolkata, India
! !! Player !! Rating !! 1 !! 2 !! 3 !! 4 !! 5 !! 6 !! 7 !! 8 !! 9 !! 10 !! Total !! TB !! SB 
|-
|-style="background:#ccffcc;"
| 1 || align=left| || 2323 || || ½ || 0 || ½ || 1 || 1 || 1 || 1 || ½ || 1 || 6½ || || 
|-
| 2 || align="left" ||| 2761 || ½ ||  || ½
| 1 || ½ || 1 || ½ || 0 || 1 || ½ || 5½ || 1½ ||
|-
| 3 || align="left" ||| 1821 || 1 ||½||  || ½ || ½ || ½ || ½ || ½ || 1 || ½
| 5½ || 1 ||
|-
| 4 || align="left" ||| 2639 || ½ || 0 || ½ ||  || ½ || ½ || ½ || 1 || 1 || 1 || 5½|| ½ ||
|-
| 5 || align="left" ||| 2388 || 0 || ½ || ½ || ½ ||  || ½ || 1 || ½ || ½ || 1 || 5 || || 19.75
|-
| 6 || align="left" ||| 2647 || 0 || 0 || ½ || ½ || ½ ||  || 1 || 1 || ½ || 1 || 5|| || 19.00
|-
| 7 || align="left" ||| 2516 || 0 || ½ || ½ || ½ || 0 || 0 ||  || 1 || 1 || 1 || 4½|| ||
|-
| 8 || align="left" ||| 2715 || 0 || 1 || ½ || 0 || ½ || 0 || 0 ||  || 1 || 1 || 4 ||  ||
|-
| 9 || align="left" ||| 2626 || ½ || 0 || 0 || 0 || ½ || ½ || 0 || 0 ||  || ½ || 2|| || 
|-
| 10 || align="left" ||| 2210 || 0 || ½ || ½ || 0 || 0 || 0 || 0 || 0 || ½ ||  || 1½|| || 
|}
{| class="wikitable" style="text-align: center;"
|+Tata Steel Chess India Blitz, 20–21 November 2021, Kolkata, India
! !! Player !! Rating !! 1 !! 2 !! 3 !! 4 !! 5 !! 6 !! 7 !! 8 !! 9 !! 10 !! Total !! TB !! SB 
|-
|-style="background:#ccffcc;"
| 1 || align=left| || 2767|| || ½ 0|| 0 ½|| ½ ½|| ½ 1|| ½ 1|| 1 0|| 1 1 || 1 ½ || 11 || 11½ || || 
|-
| 2 || align="left" | || 2616|| ½ 1||  || ½ 0|| ½ 0|| 1 0|| ½ 1|| 1 ½|| ½ ½|| 1 1|| 1 1|| 11½ || ||
|-
| 3 || align="left" | || 2601 || 1 ½|| ½ 1||  || 0 1|| 1 0|| 0 1|| 1 1|| 0 0|| 1 0|| 1 1|| 11 || ||
|-
| 4 || align="left" | || 2667 || ½ ½|| ½ 1 || 1 0 ||  || 0 1 || ½ 0|| 1 1 || 0 1 || 0 1 || 1 1 || 11 || || 
|-
| 5 || align="left" | || 2376 || ½ 0|| 0 1|| 0 1|| 1 0||  || 1 1|| ½ 1|| 0 0|| 1 1|| ½ ½|| 10 ||  || 
|-
| 6 || align="left" | || 2774 || ½ 0|| ½ 0|| 1 0|| ½ 1|| 0 0||  || 0 ½|| 1 0|| 1 ½|| 1 1|| 8½ ||  || 
|-
| 7 || align="left" | || 2660 || 0 1 || 0 ½ || 0 0 || 0 0 || ½ 0|| 1 ½ ||  || 1 1|| 1 1|| ½ 0|| 8 || || 
|-
| 8 || align="left" | || 2517 || 0 0|| ½ ½|| 1 1|| 1 0|| 1 1|| 0 1|| 0 0||  || 0 0|| 0 1|| 8 || || 
|-
| 9 || align="left" | || 2739 || 0 ½|| 0 0|| 0 1|| 1 0|| 0 0|| 0 ½|| 0 0|| 1 1||  || 1½  || 6½ || || 
|-
| 10 || align="left" | || 2422 || 0 0|| 0 0|| 0 0|| 0 0|| ½ ½|| 0 0|| ½ 1|| 1 0|| 0 ½||  || 4 || || 
|}

2022  
{| class="wikitable" style="text-align: center;"
|+Tata Steel Chess India Rapid Open, 29 November–1 December 2022, Kolkata, India
! !! Player !! Rating !! 1 !! 2 !! 3 !! 4 !! 5 !! 6 !! 7 !! 8 !! 9 !! 10 !! Points !!  !! SB !! 
|-style="background: #ccffcc;"
| 1 || align=left|  || 2616 ||  || 0 || 1 || ½ || 1 || 1 || ½ || 1 || ½ || 1 || 6½ ||  ||  ||
|-
| 2 || align="left" |  || 2628 || 1 ||  || ½ || 1 || ½ || 1 || 1 || ½ || ½ || 0 || 6 || ||  ||
|-
| 3 || align="left" |  || 2662 || 0 || ½ ||  || ½ || ½ || ½ || 1 || ½ || ½ || ½ || 4½ || 2½ ||  || 
|-
| 4 || align="left" |  || 2789 || ½ || 0 || ½ ||  || ½ || 1 || 0 || 1 || 0 || 1 || 4½ || 2 || 18.25 || 
|-
| 5 || align="left" |  || 2632 || 0 || ½ || ½ || ½ ||  || 0 || 1 || 1 || 0 || 1 || 4½ || 2 || 18.00 ||
|-
| 6 || align="left" |  || 2747 || 0 || 0 || ½ || 0 || 1 ||  || ½ || ½ || 1  || 1 || 4½ || 2 || 17.00 || 
|-
| 7 || align="left" |  || 2676 || ½ || 0 || 0 || 1 || 0 || ½ ||  || ½ || 1 || 1 || 4½ || 1½ || ||
|-
| 8 || align="left" |  || 2641 || 0 || ½ || ½ || 0 || 0 || ½ || ½ ||  || 1 || 1 || 4 || 1 || || 
|-
| 9 || align="left" |  || 2784 || ½ || ½ || ½ || 1 || 1 || 0 || 0 || 0 ||  || ½ || 4 || 0 || || 
|-
| 10 || align="left" |  || 2545 || 0 || 1 || ½ || 0 || 0 || 0 || 0 || 0 ||  ½ ||  || 2 || || ||
|}
{| class="wikitable" style="text-align: center;"
|+Tata Steel Chess India Rapid Women, 29 November–1 December 2022, Kolkata, India
! !! Player !! Rating !! 1 !! 2 !! 3 !! 4 !! 5 !! 6 !! 7 !! 8 !! 9 !! 10 !! Points !!  !! SB !! 
|-style="background: #ccffcc;"
| 1 || align=left| || 2371 
! 
| ½ || ½ || 1 || ½ || ½ || 1 || 1 || ½ || 1 || 6½|| ½||  26||4
|-
| 2 || align="left" | || 2475 || ½ 
! 
| ½ || ½ || ½ || 1 || 1 || 1 || ½ || 1 || 6½|| ½||  26||4
|-
| 3 || align="left" | || 2475 || ½ || ½ 
! 
| ½ || ½ || ½ || 1 || ½ || ½ || 1 || 5½|| || || 
|-
| 4 || align="left" | || 2476 || 0 || ½ || ½ 
! 
| ½ || ½ || 1 || 1 || ½ || ½ || 5|| 1 || ||
|-
| 5 || align="left" |  || 2474 || ½ || ½ || ½ || ½ 
! 
| ½ || 0 || ½ || 1 || 1 || 5|| 1 || ||
|-
| 6 || align="left" |  || 2351 || ½ || 0 || ½ || ½ || ½ 
! 
| 0 || 1 || 1  || 1 || 5|| 1 || ||
|-
| 7 || align="left" |  || 2304 || 0 || 0 || 0 || 0 || 1 || 1 
! 
| 1 || ½ || 1 || 4½|| || ||
|-
| 8 || align="left" |  || 2262 || 0 || 0 || ½ || 0 || ½ || 0 || 0 
! 
| 1 || 1 || 3|| 1 || || 
|-
| 9 || align="left" |  || 2458 || ½ || ½ || ½ || ½ || 0 || 0 || ½ || 0 
! 
| ½ || 3|| 0 || || 
|-
| 10 || align="left" |  || 2311 || 0 || 0 || 0 || ½ || 0 || 0 || 0 || 0 ||  ½ 
! 
| 1 
|
|
|
|}

{| class="wikitable" style="text-align: center;"
|+Tata Steel Chess India Blitz Open, 3–4 December 2022, Kolkata, India
! !! Player !! Rating !! 1 !! 2 !! 3 !! 4 !! 5 !! 6 !! 7 !! 8 !! 9 !! 10 !! Points !!  !! SB !! 
|- style="background: #ccffcc;"
| 1 || align="left" |  || 2750 ||  || 1 1 || 0 1 || 1 0 || ½ 1 || 1 ½ || ½ ½ || ½ 1 || 1 0 || 1 1 || 12½ || || ||
|-
| 2 || align="left" |  || 2909 || 0 0 ||  || ½ ½ || 1 0 || ½ 1 || 1 1 || 0 1 || 1 1 || 1 1 || 0 1 || 11½ || || ||
|-
| 3 || align="left" |  || 2733 || 1 0 || ½ ½ ||  || ½ ½ || 0 0 || 1 ½ || 1 ½ || 1 0 || 0 ½ || 1 1 || 9½ || || ||
|-
| 4 || align="left" |  || 2672 || 0 1 || 0 1 || ½ ½ ||  || 1 ½ || 0 0 || 0 1 || 1 ½ || ½ ½ || 1 0 || 9 || 1½ || ||
|-
| 5 || align="left" |  || 2669 || ½ 0 || ½ 0 || 1 1 || 0 ½ ||  || 0 1 || 1 0 || ½ 1 || 1 0 || 1 0 || 9 || ½ || ||
|-
| 6 || align="left" |  || 2599 || 0 ½ || 0 0 || 0 ½ || 1 1 || 1 0 ||  || 0 1 || 1 0 || 1 ½ || 0 1 || 8½ || || ||
|-
| 7 || align="left" |  || 2702 || ½ ½ || 1 0 || 0 ½ || 1 0 || 0 1 || 1 0 ||  || 1 0 || ½ 0 || 0 1 || 8 || 1 || 73.50 ||
|-
| 8 || align="left" |  || 2763 || ½ 0 || 0 0 || 0 1 || 0 ½ || ½ 0 || 0 1 || 0 1 ||  || 1 ½ || 1 1 || 8 || 1 || 65.50 ||
|-
| 9 || align="left" |  || 2666 || 0 1 || 0 0 || 1 ½ || ½ ½ || 0 1 || 0 ½ || ½ 1 || 0 ½ ||  || 0 ½ || 7½ || || ||
|-
| 10 || align="left" |  || 2632 || 0 0 || 1 0 || 0 0 || 0 1 || 0 1 || 1 0 || 1 0 || 0 0 || 1 ½ ||  || 6½ || || ||
|}
{| class="wikitable" style="text-align: center;"
|+Tata Steel Chess India Blitz Women, 3–4 December 2022, Kolkata, India
! !! Player !! Rating !! 1 !! 2 !! 3 !! 4 !! 5 !! 6 !! 7 !! 8 !! 9 !! 10 !! Points !!  !! SB !! 
|- style="background: #ccffcc;"
| 1 || align="left" |  || 2361 
! 
| ½ ½ || ½ ½ || 0 0 || 1 1 || 1 ½ || 1 1 || 1 1 || 1 1 || 1 1 || 13½ || || ||
|-
| 2 || align="left" |  || 2427 || ½ ½ 
! 
| 1 0 || ½ ½ || 1 0 || 1 1 || 1 0 || 1 1 || 1 0 || 1 1 || 12 || || ||
|-
| 3 || align="left" |  || 2407 || ½ ½ || 0 1 
! 
| 0 1 || 1 ½ || ½ 1 || ½ 0 || 1 1 || ½ 1 || 1 0 || 11 || || ||
|-
| 4 || align="left" |  || 2460 || 1 1 || ½ ½ || 1 0 
! 
| 0 0 || 1 ½ || ½ ½ || 0 1 || 1 1 || 0 1 || 10½ || || ||
|-
| 5 || align="left" |  || 2474 || 0 0 || 0 1 || 0 ½ || 1 1 
! 
| ½ ½ || ½ 0 || 1 0 || 1 1 || ½ 1 || 9½ || || ||
|-
| 6 || align="left" |  || 2395 || 0 ½ || 0 0 || ½ 0 || 0 ½ || ½ ½ 
! 
| 1 1 || 1 ½ || ½ 1 || ½ ½ || 8½ || 2|| ||
|-
| 7 || align="left" |  || 2416 || 0 0 || 0 1 || ½ 1 || ½ ½ || ½ 1 || 0 0 
! 
| 0 1 || 0 1 || ½ 1 || 8½ || 0 || ||
|-
| 8 || align="left" |  || 2311 || 0 0 || 0 0 || 0 0 || 1 0 || 0 1 || 0 ½ || 1 0 
!
|1 0|| 1 1 || 6½ || || ||
|-
| 9 || align="left" |  || 2279 || 0 0 || 0 1 || ½ 0 || 0 0 || 0 0 || ½ 0 || 1 0 || 0 1 
!
|1 1|| 6 || || ||
|-
| 10 || align="left" |  || 2209 || 0 0 || 0 0 || 0 1 || 1 0 || ½ 0 || ½ ½ || ½ 0 
|0 0|| 0 0 
! 
| 4 || || ||
|}

References

Tata Steel
Chess competitions
Chess in India
International sports competitions hosted by India
Sports competitions in Kolkata